Ponich is a surname. Notable people with the surname include:

 Marissa Ponich (born 1987), Canadian fencer
 Michael Ponich (1905–1957), Canadian politician

See also
 Povich